OverDrive, Inc. is a digital distributor of eBooks, audiobooks, online magazines, and streaming video titles. The company provides digital rights management and download fulfillment services for publishers, libraries, schools, corporations, and book retailers.

History 
OverDrive was founded in 1986 and initially converted analog media to digital formats, such as interactive diskettes and CD-ROMs. In 2000, the company opened Content Reserve, an online eBook and downloadable audiobook repository from which its distribution business developed.

In 2012, the company announced a series of service upgrades, including a browser-based eReader,and audiobook streaming, which enable access to audiobooks via the company’s OverDrive Media Console app. The company also developed a media station, which allows users to browse their library's digital collection on touchscreen monitors and internet workstations. An API is available which allows developers to integrate OverDrive content into various apps and platforms. The company announced a partnership with LexisNexis to provide the LexisNexis Digital Library, a customized eLending platform for the legal library market.

In 2014, OverDrive completed its headquarters in the Cleveland suburb of Garfield Heights, Ohio.

In April 2015, Rakuten bought OverDrive for $410 million, with the deal set to close in April 2015. OverDrive CEO Steve Potash remained in his position and OverDrive kept its name while operating under Rakuten USA.

In 2019, it was reported that private equity firm KKR would be purchasing OverDrive from Rakuten. The price of the sale was not disclosed, though Rakuten said it would recognize about $365.6 million in profit from the sale in the first quarter of 2020. Potash later offered more details about the KKR acquisition in a message to OverDrive's library customers; the acquisition was finalized in June 2020.

In June 2020, RBMedia sold its library assets to OverDrive; this includes RBDigital, an app and service for the distribution of digital content. RBMedia and OverDrive are both owned by KKR, with KKR's OverDrive purchase concluded in June 2020. The sale of RBMedia's library division to OverDrive represents a merger of KKR's related assets.

On June 9, 2021, it was announced that OverDrive had reached a deal to acquire Kanopy, an on-demand streaming video platform.

Libraries and schools
OverDrive launched its Digital Library Reserve, a digital download platform for public libraries, in 2002. In 2004, the platform was changed into a DRM-protected audiobook download platform. In 2005, OverDrive installed download stations into public libraries and added music to its library platform. OverDrive added downloadable videos in April 2006. In 2007, the company launched its School Download Library, an eBook service for K–12 schools based on Digital Library Reserve. In March 2008, the company announced plans to provide MP3 audiobooks to public libraries as well as retailers.

OverDrive's Libby and Sora programs for mobile devices can check out eBooks and audiobooks from libraries.

Book retail
Before entering the library market, OverDrive distributed eBooks to many e-tailers. In 2002, OverDrive was selected as the distributor of HarperCollins’ eBooks to the publisher's online retail stores. OverDrive launched web stores for Harlequin Enterprises in 2005. In 2008, OverDrive announced that it would provide download services for Borders Books.

OverDrive has entered into partnerships with technology companies including Adobe Systems, Microsoft, Mobipocket, and Nokia. In 2008, Adobe and OverDrive jointly announced that OverDrive would be the co-developer and operator of Adobe ADEPT, a hosted DRM service to protect files viewed with Adobe Digital Editions.

In 2012, OverDrive partnered with Nokia to launch Nokia Reading, an eReading app and service for Nokia's Lumia 900, 800, 710, and 610 Windows Phone devices.

Products and services 
OverDrive's download services include several software as a service products for libraries, retailers, schools, publishers, and the military, as well as web-based products for content protection and management.

Libby is an OverDrive mobile app which supports users in accessing services from their local libraries.

Events and outreach 
OverDrive holds a biennial user group meeting called Digipalooza to train and educate librarians on the download service. Held in Cleveland, Ohio, the event focuses on trends, best practices, and outreach ideas for public library download websites.

At the 2008 Public Library Association National Conference, OverDrive unveiled preliminary plans for the nationally touring Digital Bookmobile. The travelling exhibit is housed inside an 18-wheeler and visits public libraries throughout the OverDrive network. Inside the tractor-trailer, learning stations guide patrons through all aspects of their public library's download service. As of August 2012, OverDrive has hosted more than 500 Digital Bookmobile events at libraries and community centers throughout North America.

In 2011, OverDrive CEO Steve Potash made obvious hints that the Amazon Kindle would join other major eReaders in their system as soon as September 2011. In his "Crystal Ball Report," during the final session of OverDrive's July 2011 Digipalooza conference, he hinted at the month of release.
On September 21, 2011, OverDrive began supporting Kindle public library book borrowing.

On September 18, 2014, OverDrive debuted International "Read an Ebook" Day, "an annual holiday to celebrate and raise awareness for reading on digital devices." Leading up to and on that day, OverDrive encouraged "readers around the world" to participate "by choosing from millions of free eBooks from their local library or purchasing an eBook from a retailer online." Additionally, throughout the day, OverDrive celebrated the holiday by giving away tablets and devices every hour on the event website (www.readanebookday.com) and through social media to readers who tell their story of what eBooks mean to them, by using the hashtag #eBookDay on Facebook or Twitter to tell their story, or commenting directly at the event website.

Criticism

Audiobooks
OverDrive is criticized for relying on digital rights management (DRM) protection technology from Microsoft for the bulk of its audiobooks. Microsoft's refusal to update its Macintosh versions of Windows Media Player to accommodate the requisite encryption scheme disqualifies Apple computer users from accessing the bulk of OverDrive's audio files, which are formatted as DRM Windows Media Audio (WMA).

In March 2008, OverDrive announced that it would distribute a collection of approximately 3,000 audiobooks in the MP3 format, which is more widely compatible. On November 19, 2008, OverDrive also released the OverDrive Media Console for Mac, which allows Mac owners to download and listen to MP3 audiobooks from their library on a home computer. OverDrive's streaming audiobook option—released in 2012—enables Mac users to access many audiobooks that were previously unavailable due to WMA compatibility issues.

Fictionwise
In January 2009, OverDrive informed Fictionwise that it would no longer be providing downloads for purchasers of eBooks through Fictionwise as of January 31, 2009; no reason was provided to Fictionwise as to why it was being shut down. This prevents previous purchasers from being able to renew their books on new devices. Fictionwise was working to provide replacement eBooks for its customers in alternative, non-DRM-protected formats, but did not have the rights to provide all of the books in different formats.

See also
3M Library Systems
Adobe Content Server
Axis360
Digital library
Hoopla (digital media service)
Kanopy
Public library
Publishing

References

Audiobook companies and organizations
Software companies based in Ohio
Companies based in Cleveland
American companies established in 1986
Commercial digital libraries
1986 establishments in Ohio
Library resources
Book selling websites
Ebook suppliers
Ebook sources
American digital libraries
Mass media companies of the United States
Software companies of the United States
Software companies established in 1986
Retail companies established in 1986
2015 mergers and acquisitions
2020 mergers and acquisitions
Kohlberg Kravis Roberts companies